Chimel v. California, 395 U.S. 752 (1969), was a 1969 United States Supreme Court case in which the Court held that police officers arresting a person at home could not search the entire home without a search warrant, but police may search the area within immediate reach of the person without a warrant. The rule on searches incident to a lawful arrest within the home is now known as the Chimel Rule.

Ronald M. George, the young Deputy Attorney General who unsuccessfully argued the State of California's position before the high court, ultimately became Chief Justice of the State of California.

Background
In the court case of Chimel v. California (1969), police officers went into the home of Chimel with a warrant authorizing their arrest of Chimel on counts of burglary from a coin shop.  The police officers were let into Chimel's home by his wife where they awaited his return home to serve him with his arrest warrant.  Upon receiving his warrant for arrest, "Chimel denied the request of officers to look around" his home for further evidence.  Ignoring Chimel, the police officers continued their search of Chimel's home "on the basis of the lawful arrest", and the police even "instructed Chimel's wife to remove items from drawers", where she eventually found coins and metals.  Later at Chimel's trial for burglary charges, "items taken from his home were admitted over objection from Chimel that they had been unconstitutionally seized".  However, a number of these items including the coins and medals that were taken from his home were used to convict Chimel.

The "state courts upheld the conviction" of Chimel, even though he petitioned that the arrest warrant was not a valid warrant, considering that the police officers searched his home and found evidence that they used against him, without having a search warrant for his house.  Prior to Chimel, the Court's precedents permitted an arresting officer to search the area within an arrestee's "possession" and "control" for the purpose of gathering evidence.  Based on the "abstract doctrine," it had sustained searches that extended far beyond an arrestee's grabbing area.

Issue
Could the warrantless search of Chimel's entire house be constitutionally justified as incident to his arrest?

Decision and significance 
The Supreme Court ruled 6–2 in favor of Chimel. It held that the search of Chimel's house was unreasonable under the Fourth and Fourteenth Amendments.

The Court reasoned that searches "incident to arrest" are limited to the area within the immediate control of the suspect. While police could reasonably search and seize evidence on or around the arrestee's person, police were prohibited from rummaging through the entire house without a search warrant. The Court emphasized the importance of warrants and probable cause as necessary bulwarks against government abuse:

It overturned the trial court conviction by stating that the officers could reasonably search only "the petitioner's person and the area from within which he might have obtained either a weapon or something that could have been used as evidence against him."

Criticism 
In a concurring/dissenting opinion in Riley v. California (2014), citing his dissent in Arizona v. Gant (2009), Justice Alito called Chimel'''s reasoning "questionable:" "I think it is a mistake to allow that reasoning to affect cases like these that concern the search of the person of arrestees."

See also
 List of United States Supreme Court cases, volume 395

 References 

External links
 
 Search Incident to Arrest'', US Supreme Court Center.

United States Supreme Court decisions that overrule a prior Supreme Court decision
United States Supreme Court cases
United States Supreme Court cases of the Warren Court
United States Fourth Amendment case law
1969 in United States case law
1969 in California
Legal history of California